Gnana Soundari may refer to:

 Gnana Soundari (Citadel film)
 Gnana Soundari (Gemini film)